Dept. of Disappearance is the second solo studio album by American indie rock musician Jason Lytle. It was released on October 16, 2012 by record label ANTI-. Regarding the album, Lytle noted, "If there were any deliberate attempts on this record, it was trying to get back to more of a fairy-tale-ish-fantasy thing that was once again rooted in reality, with drums, pianos and real instruments."

Writing and composition
Regarding the album's lyrical and thematic content, Jason Lytle noted, "I think if anything, some of the elements that used to drive a lot of my favourite Grandaddy songs home, was this whole storytelling aspect. Creating these little worlds and creating sounds and creating lines [where] you almost have to create your own little image to go with what you're hearing. [...] I had this recurring image throughout the album, and I don't know where this came from. It's this recurring image, of some sort of tragedy. It's a woman, stranded, up high, in a blizzard, among the rocks and a guy who is down in the valley who can't do anything about it and its this distress of him knowing he can't do anything about it. I think there are two or three songs, where that imagery pops up."

Reception 

AllMusic's Tim Sendra gave the album a positive review, stating "Dept. of Disappearance shows that far from vanishing, Lytle is making a claim to be one of the more interesting and consistent singer-songwriters around; willing to take sonic chances, but always delivering music that's as much about feel as it is about meaning."

Stephen Deusner of Pitchfork gave the album a mixed review, noting "[The track 'Your Final Setting Sun'] says more about Lytle's career than any veiled lyric could: If he can't push himself in new directions, he'll be stuck at his desk job, pushing paper for the Department of Disappearance forever."

Track listing

Personnel 
 Jason Lytle - vocals, guitar, keyboards, piano, drums, percussion, dulcimer, melodica, effects, production, recording, engineering, mixing, album art, photography

 Additional personnel
 Brett Allen - recording assistance
 Larry Crane - mixing
 Greg Calbi - mastering
 Rob Jones - album layout and design
 Stefano Felcini - photography
 John Garner - cover photograph

References

External links
Dept. of Disappearance on Anti- Records' official website

2012 albums
Jason Lytle albums
Anti- (record label) albums